The Romic Alphabet, sometimes known as the Romic Reform, is a phonetic alphabet proposed by Henry Sweet. It descends from Ellis's Palaeotype alphabet and English Phonotypic Alphabet, and is the direct ancestor of the International Phonetic Alphabet. In Romic every sound had a dedicated symbol, and every symbol represented a single sound. There were no capital letters; there were letters derived from small capitals, though these were distinct letters.

There were two variants, Broad Romic and Narrow Romic. Narrow Romic utilized italics to distinguish fine details of pronunciation; Broad Romic was cruder, and in it the vowels had their English "short" sounds when written singly, and their "long" sounds when doubled:

Sweet adopted from Ellis and earlier philologists a method creating new letters by rotating existing ones, as in this way no new type would need to be cast:

The IPA letter  acquired its modern pronunciation and first use with this alphabet. He resurrected three Anglo-Saxon letters, ash , eth  and thorn , the first two of which had the pronunciations they retain in the IPA.

Tables

Consonants
The consonants were as follows by 1892:

Apart from Sweet's use of italic h for voicelessness, the rest of the alphabet continues intact in the modern IPA.

Vowels
The vowels were as follows by 1892.

In "wide" vowels, the tongue is described as relaxed and flattened; in "narrow", it is tense and more convex. This corresponds to descriptions of vowels as lax and tense. Lax vowels are indicated by italic type. In the case of the mid back unrounded vowel , the description of its place of articulation does not accord well with some of the words given as examples. Sweet described vowels as narrowed with the tongue raised as in high vowels, but the jaw open as in low vowels. This conflicts with the presentation of the IPA, in which high and close are synonymous, as are low and open.

Italic a takes its traditional shape, which would later be made distinct in the IPA. Long vowels are written double.

These are defined by Sweet as:
: French , : German , Scots , : Swedish 
: French , : French , : Swedish 
: Welsh , : German , : English sir
: Norwegian , ...
: Gaelic , : English but, : Cockney park
: French , Scots , : German , : English law

The lax vowels are defined by Sweet as:
: English bit, : English men, : English man
: French , : (German  is overrounded œ)
: English pretty, : start of English eye, better, : start of English how, Portuguese 
: English value, : French 
: English father, : Swedish 
: English put, : German , English boy, : English not

History 
The 1877 version of the Romic alphabet differed rather substantially from the 1892 version. It was very similar to Ellis's Paleotype.

Vowels
Central vowels were indicated with a non-italic 'h' rather than a diaeresis, with regular  for later irregular .

The unrounded back vowels were irregular in their composition, in that laxness was not indicated by italicizing, which was used instead for the low vowels. They were (tense) high , mid  (English but), low  and (lax) high , mid  (English father) and low  (Scots ).

 was used for the unstressed English schwa. It was not listed in the vowel chart because it was not considered to have any particular articulation, being merely an independent element of voicing (what Sweet called a 'glide vowel'), and the voiced equivalent of unarticulated  (which would later become ).  is an open glottis,  (or ) a whispery glottis.

Reduced or barely pronounced sounds were marked by brackets, so .

Consonants
Glottal stop was x, the velar nasal q. Digraphs were used where later Sweet would use distinct characters.

Modifications of consonants

Where the IPA uses superscript letters for secondary articulation, Sweet used italics. An italic  was used for trills, e.g.

(This was not italicized, but would be later when replaced with h.) Whispered sounds were marked e.g. .

As with vowels, barely articulated or pronounced consonants were set off with [brackets].

Much of the notation for phonetic detail may have carried over into later versions.

Stress and pitch
Stress is indicated with a  placed after the onset of the syllable, as in  'try' ( 'a try' vs  'at Rye').

Tone and intonation were indicated with iconic symbols such as rising , falling , level , rising-falling , etc., as in early IPA usage.

See also 
History of the IPA

Bibliography 
 Sweet, Henry. (1877) A Handbook of Phonetics, Including a Popular Exposition of the Principles of Spelling Reform, Oxford: Clarendon Press. (on archive.org)

External links
 Henry Sweet's Romic alphabet reform

Notes

Phonetic alphabets
English spelling reform